Overall, 44 players have represented the Kenyan national cricket team in Twenty20 International (T20I) cricket. Kenya made its Twenty20 International debut in September 2007, against Bangladesh. Kenya lost its T20I status in January 2014, at the same time losing its One Day International (ODI) status. This was a result of the team's performance at the 2014 World Cup Qualifier, where they placed fifth. In April 2018, the ICC decided to grant full Twenty20 International (T20I) status to all its members. Therefore, all Twenty20 matches played between Kenya and other ICC members after 1 January 2019 will have T20I status.

This list includes all players who have played at least one T20I match and is initially arranged in the order of debut appearance. Where more than one player won their first cap in the same match, those players are initially listed alphabetically at the time of debut.

Key

List of players

Last updated 25 November 2022.

References 

Kenya

T20I